Andrew Craddock Lyles Jr. (May 17, 1918 – September 27, 2013) was an American film producer for Paramount Pictures, who is best known for producing a variety of Westerns in the 1950s and '60s.

Career
Born in Jacksonville, Florida, Lyles began working for Paramount Studios after high school. He began as an office boy, worked in the publicity department of Pine-Thomas Productions, the second feature unit of Paramount, and eventually became assistant to the producer on The Mountain, released in 1954. His first role as full producer was on James Cagney's sole directorial effort, the 1957 Short Cut to Hell (a remake of the 1941 noir classic This Gun for Hire). He also produced nine episodes of the television show Rawhide then the Korean War film The Young and the Brave for Metro-Goldwyn-Mayer.

In an interview with Alex Simon and Donald Keith, Lyles recalled he was approached by Paramount to do a Western when they realized they had none on their schedule of releases. When Law of the Lawless did well at the box office, Paramount asked him how many more he could do a year. Lyles replied "five" and he was given the go ahead to produce more second features for the studio. Lyles filled his casts with many older, experienced actors who were his friends.

Lyles continued to produce a variety of low-budget traditional Westerns for Paramount in the 1960s, as well as other movies in other genres, such as the detective drama Rogue's Gallery in 1968, and the science-fiction film Night of the Lepus, for MGM, that featured the American Southwest menaced by giant mutant rabbits.

On March 3, 1988, Lyles was awarded a star on the Hollywood Walk of Fame located at 6840 Hollywood Blvd.

Lyles' last work was as consulting producer on the HBO television series Deadwood, created by David Milch.

Personal
Lyles married actress Martha Vickers in March 1948, but the couple divorced that September.

He married Martha French in 1955.

On September 27, 2013, Lyles died at his Los Angeles home.  He was 95 and survived by his wife; they had no children.

Filmography

References

Further reading

 Paramount Through the Memories & Stories of A.C. Lyles (DVD), Paramount Home Entertainment, 2014.  .

External links
 Wildest Westerns: A.C. Lyles: Gentleman of the West
 

1918 births
2013 deaths
Paramount Pictures
People from Jacksonville, Florida
Film producers from Florida
Television producers from Florida